Joginder Singh (1919-August 1, 1990) was an Indian professional wrestler. He was the first All Asia Tag Team Champion, along with King Kong. He was one of the top professional wrestlers of India at that time.

Early life
He was born in village Sheron, Tarn Taran, Punjab, British India into a Sikh family.

Professional wrestling career

Singapore
In 1948, Tiger Joginder and Arjan Singh Das were signed by Great World's wrestling promoters, where he competed against many top wrestlers like King Kong, Bill Verna, George Zbisko, Tiger Ray Holden and Seelie Samara, and earned fame worldwide.

United States

Tiger wrestled in the United States in the late 1940s to the early 1950s, with wrestlers such as The French Angel, Ted Christy, Kola Kwariani, Jack Dempsey, Oki Shikina, Lord Carlton, and Benny Trudel. On 8 March 1950, his match with Chief Thunderbird at Paramount Theatre had attracted much interest.

India
In 1954, Tiger competed in the Rustam-e-Hind (Champion of India) tournament, but lost in the final to Dara Singh. The same year, he defeated European Heavyweight Champion Bert Assirati in front of the 50,000 spectators at Bombay. In 1959, he competed in another professional wrestling tournament Commonwealth Championship, but didn't succeed.

Japan
On 16 November 1955 in the Japan Wrestling Association, he and King Kong defeated Rikidōzan and Harold Sakata in a two out of three falls match at JWA All Asia Championship tournament final to crown the inaugural All Asia Tag Team Champions. But he failed to capture the All Asia Heavyweight Championship in the single competition.

Filmography
He also did acting in some Indian films in the 1960s with fellow wrestlers Dara Singh, King Kong and Randhawa.

Championship and accomplishments
Japan Wrestling Association
All Asia Tag Team Championship (1 time)- with King Kong

References

External links
  

Indian male professional wrestlers
1919 births
1990 deaths
Indian male film actors
20th-century Indian male actors
Male actors in Hindi cinema
Male actors in Punjabi cinema
Punjabi people
20th-century professional wrestlers
All Asia Tag Team Champions 
 Indian professional wrestlers